Master the Mess is an American reality home improvement series hosted by Clea Shearer and Joanna Teplin. The show was announced on July 10, 2018 and premiered on September 4, 2018 on DirecTV.

Premise 
The series follows Shearer and Teplin follows the organizers in other people's closets, pantries and bathroom cabinets.

Episodes

Season 1

References

External links
 

2018 American television series debuts
Home renovation television series
English-language television shows
2010s American reality television series
2018 American television series endings